Kahal Zur Israel was a Jewish synagogue located at Rua do Bom Jesus (Rua dos Judeus) number 197 in Recife, Brazil. It was established in 1636 by Portuguese and Spanish Sephardic Jews that had taken refuge in the Netherlands fleeing forced conversion and were joined by New Christians, who possibly helped to build the structure and were already living in the colony. It was the first synagogue erected in the Americas. The building is now a museum, including a Torah and bema as well as archeological excavations displaying various parts of the original synagogue, such as the mikveh.

History

From 1636 to 1654, the synagogue functioned on the site of the houses no. 197 and 203 Rua do Bom Jesus (formerly Rua dos Judeus, lit. 'Street of the Jews'). It flourished in the mid-17th century when the Dutch briefly controlled this part of northeastern Brazil. The synagogue then served a community of approximately 1,450 Jews. It had a cantor, Josue Velosino, and a rabbi, Isaac Aboab da Fonseca, sent to Recife in 1642.

The original synagogue building survived until the early 20th century when it was torn down. The site has been confirmed by an archaeological excavation. In 2001 the decision was made to create a Jewish museum in the two-story house with two shops located on the first floor then standing on the site of the old synagogue.

Present day
The museum, designed to resemble synagogues built in the 17th and 18th centuries by Sephardic Jews from Spain and Portugal, opened in 2001. Today, there are four synagogues in Recife. Many Jews choose to celebrate their weddings and Bnei Mitzvot celebrations in the Kahal Zur Israel because of its symbolism as a connection to their long history in this country. The synagogue is also at the center of a broader cultural renaissance. In November of every year, a Jewish festival offering dance, cinema, and food, from gefilte fish to fluden, attracts around 20,000 visitors.

References

External links

 José Luiz Mota Menezes, Sinagoga Kahal Zur Israel, Recife-PE

Religious buildings and structures in Recife
Ethnic museums in Brazil
History museums in Brazil
Jewish museums
Jews and Judaism in Recife
Museums in Recife
Sephardi Jewish culture in Brazil
Sephardi synagogues
Synagogues in Brazil
Synagogues preserved as museums
Dutch Brazil
Religion in the Dutch Empire
Buildings and structures associated with the Dutch West India Company
Portuguese-Brazilian culture
Portuguese-Jewish diaspora
Spanish Brazilian
Spanish-Jewish diaspora
Spanish and Portuguese Jews